The Lay Range is a small subrange of the Swannell Ranges of the Omineca Mountains, located between Lay Creek and Swannell River in northern British Columbia, Canada.

References

Lay Range in the Canadian Mountain Encyclopedia

Swannell Ranges